José Carlos Terrón Arroyo (born 15 April 1991) is a Spanish footballer who plays as a defender.

Career statistics

Club

Notes

References

1991 births
Living people
People from Torrelavega
Spanish footballers
Spanish expatriate footballers
Association football defenders
Racing de Santander players
FC Barcelona players
Parma Calcio 1913 players
CA Osasuna B players
CA Osasuna players
Lane United FC players
FC Tucson players
Segunda División B players
USL League Two players
USL League One players
Spanish expatriate sportspeople in Italy
Expatriate footballers in Italy
Spanish expatriate sportspeople in the United States
Expatriate soccer players in the United States